In economics, a budget-additive valuation is a kind of a utility function. It corresponds to a person that, when given a set of items, evaluates them in the following way:

 For each item j, there is a fixed value vj. 
 There is also a fixed budget B. 
 The value of the set of items is the minimum between B and the sum of values of items in the set.

Budget-additive valuations are useful in the research of online advertising, combinatorial auctions, resource allocation, and market equilibrium.

Relation to other kinds of valuations 
Every additive valuation is a special case of a budget-additive valuation, in which the budget is infinite. Every budget-additive valuation is a submodular valuation.

References

See also 

 Utility functions on indivisible goods

Utility function types